Stowgate is a small settlement in the South Kesteven district of Lincolnshire, England.

Stowgate contains very few houses, most of which are farmhouses. The settlement grew up around Stowgate Farm – the farmhouse of which still exists – which was divided into a number of smaller farms intended to provide housing and agricultural land for those who contributed to war effort. These farms still exist.

Stowgate contains a Bernard Matthews turkey farm.

External links

Aerial photograph of Stowgate

Hamlets in Lincolnshire
The Deepings
South Kesteven District